Acalolepta sulphurifera is a species of beetle in the family Cerambycidae. It was described by Frederick William Hope in 1842. It is known from Myanmar, India, and Vietnam.

References

Acalolepta
Beetles described in 1842